Bode is a surname. Notable people with the surname include:

 Boyd Henry Bode (1873–1953), American academic and philosopher
 Bruce Bode, American diabetes specialist
 Christoph Bode (born 1952), German literary scholar
 Denise Bode (born 1954), American politician
 Erin Bode, American singer
 Franz-Josef Hermann Bode (born 1951), German Roman Catholic bishop
 Georg Heinrich Bode (1802–1846), German classical philologist and translator
 Hannelore Bode (born 1941), German operatic soprano
 Hans-Jürgen Bode (born 1941), German handball player
 Harald Bode (1909–1987), German engineer

 Harold M. Bode (1910-1993), American judge
 Hendrik Wade Bode (1905–1982), American electrical engineer and inventor
 Jace Bode (born 1987), Australian footballer
 Jana Bode (born 1969), German luger
 Johann Elert Bode (1747–1826), German astronomer
 Johann Joachim Christoph Bode (1731–1793), German translator of literary works
 John Ernest Bode (1816–1874), English Anglican priest
 Johnny Bode (1912–1983), Swedish musician
 Marco Bode (born 1969), German footballer
 Matthew Bode (born 1979), Australian rules footballer 
 Mark Bode (born 1963), American comic and tattoo artist
 Ridvan Bode (born June 26, 1959), Albanian politician and former Minister of Finances and Economy
 Vaughn Bodé (1941–1975), American comics artist
 Wilhelm von Bode (1845–1929), German art historian and curator
 Wolfram Bode (born 1942), German  biochemist

German-language surnames
Low German surnames
North German surnames
Toponymic surnames